Steinfeld is a town in the district of Spittal an der Drau in Carinthia in Austria.

References

Cities and towns in Spittal an der Drau District